This list consists of players who have appeared in the Cuban League.
 List of Cuban League baseball players (A–D)
List of Cuban League baseball players (E–L)
List of Cuban League baseball players (M–R)
List of Cuban League baseball players (S–Z)

S

T

U

V

W

Z

Notes

References

Cuban